Regulation (EU) 2017/745 is a regulation of the European Union on the clinical investigation and sale of medical devices for human use. It repeals Directive 93/42/EEC (MDD), which concerns medical devices, and Directive 90/385/EEC, which concerns active implantable medical devices, on 26 May 2021.

The regulation was published on 5 April 2017 and came into force on 25 May 2017. Originally approved medical devices will have a transition time of three years (until 26 May 2021) to meet new requirements.

Changes 
Changes compared to the Medical Device Directive include changes in device classification and device scope, stricter oversight of manufacturers by Notified Bodies, introduction of the "Person Responsible for Regulatory Compliance" (PRRC) and of the economic operator concept, the requirement of Unique Device Identification marking for devices, EUDAMED registration (see below), UDI requirements, and increased post-market surveillance activities.

Scope and classification 
The scope of the MDR has been expanded to cover a range of products without an intended medical purpose. This category includes some contact lenses, tattoo removal lasers, equipment for liposuction, and others. Annex XVI of the MDR lists all the respective categories.
Additionally, the classification rules of Annex VIII of the MDR have been expanded compared to the MDD to now 22 rules.
Reusable surgical instruments are now been included in their own category, often called "I R". As per § 120(3) of the regulation, aspects relating to their re-usability are under the scope of Notified Body review starting 26 May 2024. Other classification changes relate to software (rule 11), nanomaterials (rule 19), and substance-based medical devices (rule 21).

Economic operator roles 
The MDR in §2 (35) now defines several different roles for economic operators in relation to medical devices.
The obligations of economic operators are detailed in the following sections:
 §10 - Manufacturer
 §11 - Authorised Representative
 §13 - Importer
 §14 - Distributor

Manufacturers, Authorised Representatives and importers have to register in the EUDAMED database to receive a Single Registration Number (SRN); only distributors of medical devices do not have to register.

Person responsible for regulatory compliance 
The MDR in § 15 introduces the role of the "Person Responsible for Regulatory Compliance" (PRRC), that manufacturers and Authorized Representatives will have to have available within their organisation. The PRRC is assigned several duties and responsibilities, including making sure post-market surveillance obligations are fulfilled. Persons taking on the role and responsibilities of a PRRC have to meet certain  qualitifcations with regard to education and experience. Further details on the PRRC are given in the EU guidance MDCG 2019-7.

General safety and performance requirements 
The "General Safety and Performance Requirements" (GSPR) of the MDR replace the "Essential Requirements" (ER) of the MDD. 
Annex I of the MDR lists 23 requirements, divided in three chapters:
 General requirements (1-9)
 Requirements regarding design and manufacture (10-22)
 Requirements regarding the information supplied with the device (23)

Compared to the MDD ER, the MDR GSPR have been expanded, e.g. with regards to devices for lay use, IT security, and devices without a medical purpose.
Manufacturers are expected to utilize harmonized standards and common requirements to demonstrate conformance to the GSPR.

European database on medical devices 

The European database on medical devices (EUDAMED) is a database to collect and publish information on medical devices and in-vitro-diagnostica.

EUDAMED has six modules:
 Actors registration
 UDI/Devices registration
 Notified Bodies and Certificates
 Clinical Investigations and performance studies
 Vigilance and post-market surveillance
 Market Surveillance

Data on economic operators, devices registration and certificates are available to the public.  The database will allow to link manufacturer's certification and Single Registration Number (SRN) as well as the Basic UDI. The so-called "Summary of Safety and Clinical Performance" (SSCP), required for some high-risk medical devices, will also be accessible to the public through the database. More details on the operation of EUDAMED are given in Commission Implementing Regulation (EU) 2021/2078. A similar database is the Global Unique Device Identification Database (GUDID) of the FDA.

As a key to Eudamed, the MDR introduces the Basic UDI-DI as unique device identifier. A medical device (including system- and procedure packs and IVD) needs to have an assigned Basic UDI-DI and needs to be registered in the UDI/Device part of EUDAMED. Devices with their own UDI-DI from the same manufacturer with same intended purpose, risk class and essential design and manufacturing characteristics can be grouped under one Basic UDI.
Legacy devices that do not have a previously assigned Basic UDI-DI, they are assigned an EUDAMED-DI for the purpose of registration in EUDAMED. Instead of the UDI-DI, an EUDAMED ID can be assigned for registration.

Medical Device Coordination Group 
In accordance with §103 of the MDR, the Medical Device Coordination Group (MDCG) has been established. The MDCG and its sub-groups publish guidances that provide clarification and support to national competent authorities, notified bodies and economic operators on the details of the implementation of the MDR and IVDR. The members of the MDCG are experts appointed by the EU member states.

Implementation date 
The date by which the Regulation was to be fully implemented by replacing the previous directives was originally defined as 26 May 2020. Following the international health emergency COVID-19, the European Commission and the European Parliament decided in April 2020 to postpone the deadline by one year to 26 May 2021.

Additional provisions for the transition from MDD to MDR are found in Article 120 of the regulation.

Following industry feedback, an additional extension of the transition period has been proposed by the European Commision.

See also 
 Medical device design

References

External links
Text of the regulation
EU MDR Resources

European Union regulations
Regulation of medical devices
Regulation in the European Union